The 1995 Derby City Council election took place on 4 May 1995 to elect members of Derby City Council in England. Local elections were held in the United Kingdom in 1995. This was on the same day as other local elections. The Labour Party retained control of the council.

Overall results

|-
| colspan=2 style="text-align: right; margin-right: 1em" | Total
| style="text-align: right;" | 15
| colspan=5 |
| style="text-align: right;" | 44,621
| style="text-align: right;" |

Ward results

Abbey

Babington

Chaddesden

Chellaston

Darley

Derwent

Kingsway

Litchurch

Littleover

Mackworth

Mickleover

Normanton

Osmanton

Sinfin

Spondon

References

1995 English local elections
May 1995 events in the United Kingdom
1995
1990s in Derbyshire